Omatako Constituency is an electoral constituency in the Otjozondjupa Region of Namibia. It had 11,998 inhabitants in 2004 and 7,372 registered voters . The constituency contains the settlements of Kalkfeld, Hochfeld and Ovitoto, as well as the Osire refugee camp and the Osona military base. Omatako Constituency is named after the Omatako Mountains, a prominent geological feature of the constituency.

Politics
Omatako is one of only a few Namibian constituencies that changed their political vote in the 2015 regional election and opted for a non-SWAPO councillor. Israel Hukura of the National Unity Democratic Organisation (NUDO) narrowly won with 1,187 votes, beating SWAPO's candidate Susana Mutjitua Hikopua, who gained 1,144 votes. Helga Tjipe of the Democratic Turnhalle Alliance (DTA) also ran and gained 156 votes. Councillor Hukura (NUDO) was narrowly re-elected in the 2020 regional election. He received 909 votes; Moses Hikopua (SWAPO) obtained 875.

References

Constituencies of Otjozondjupa Region
States and territories established in 1992
1992 establishments in Namibia
Otjiherero words and phrases